Skipjack may refer to:

Zoology
 Skipjack tuna, a fish of the family Scombridae
 A common name for Elateridae (click beetles)
 Skipjack shad, the fish species, Alosa chrysochloris
 Common name for Pseudocaranx georgianus, also known as silver trevally or skippy.

Maritime
 Skipjack 15, an American sailing dinghy design
 HMS Skipjack, Royal Navy, Halcyon class minesweeper, sunk by bombs in 1940
 Skipjack (boat), a type of fishing boat used on the Chesapeake Bay, USA
 USS Skipjack, the name of three United States Navy submarines
 Skipjack class submarine, a class of United States Navy nuclear submarines

In computing
 Skipjack (cipher), a block cipher, designed by the US National Security Agency
 Skipjack, the code name for Linspire 6.0, a Linux distribution
 Skipjack, the code name for the VAX 8550 computer system, introduced by Digital Equipment Corporation in 1986

Other
 Baltimore Skipjacks, former professional ice hockey team
 Skipjack Wind Farm, Offshore Delaware

Animal common name disambiguation pages